The FIBT World Championships 1979 took place in Königssee, West Germany. It was the first championships that took place on an artificially refrigerated track. The track also hosted the luge world championships that same year, the first time that had ever happened in both bobsleigh and luge in a non-Winter Olympic year (Igls hosted both events for the 1976 games in neighboring Innsbruck.).

Two man bobsleigh

Ohlwärter replaced the injured Schumann after the third heat of this event.

Four man bobsleigh

Medal table

References
2-Man bobsleigh World Champions
4-Man bobsleigh World Champions

1979
1979 in West German sport
1979 in bobsleigh
1979 in German sport
International sports competitions hosted by West Germany
Bobsleigh in Germany